The 2009 Men's Hockey World Cup Qualifiers were the 12th edition of the Hockey World Cup qualification tournament. Three events were held between October and November 2009 in France, New Zealand and Argentina and only the winner of each would earn a berth to play in the 2010 World Cup, to be held in New Delhi, India.

Pakistan, New Zealand and Argentina each won one of the three tournaments.

Qualification
All five confederations received quotas for teams to participate allocated by the International Hockey Federation based upon the FIH World Rankings. Those teams participated at their respective continental championships but could not qualify through it, and they received the chance to qualify through this tournament based on the final ranking at each competition.

–Egypt withdrew from participating. Italy was called to participate instead.

Qualifier 1

Umpires
Below are the 9 umpires appointed by the International Hockey Federation:

Richmond Attipoe (GHA)
Diego Barbas (ARG)
Will Drury (WAL)
Murray Grime (AUS)
Jang Jung-min (KOR)
Vincent Loos (BEL)
Marcelo Servetto (ESP)
Amarjit Singh (IND)
Gus Soteriades (USA)

Pool
All times are Central European Time (UTC+01:00)

Classification

Fifth and sixth place

Third and fourth place

Final

Final standings

 Qualified for the 2010 World Cup

Awards

Qualifier 2

Umpires
Below are the 9 umpires appointed by the International Hockey Federation:

Saleem Aaron (USA)
Stewart Dearing (AUS)
Marcin Grochal (POL)
Colin Hutchinson (IRL)
Satoshi Kondo (JPN)
Satinder Kumar (IND)
Warren McCully (IRL)
Tim Pullman (AUS)
Peter Wright (RSA)

Pool
All times are New Zealand Daylight Time (UTC+13:00)

Classification

Fifth and sixth place

Third and fourth place

Final

Final standings

 Qualified for the 2010 World Cup

Awards

Qualifier 3

Umpires
Below are the 9 umpires appointed by the International Hockey Federation:

Michiel Bruning (NED)
Nigel Iggo (NZL)
Adam Kearns (AUS)
Andrew Kennedy (ENG)
Marc Knulle (FRA)
Martin Madden (SCO)
Francesco Parisi (ITA)
Juan Manuel Requena (ESP)
Gary Simmonds (RSA)

Pool
All times are Argentina Time (UTC−03:00)

Classification

Fifth and sixth place

Third and fourth place

Final

Final standings

 Qualified for the 2010 World Cup

Awards

References

External links
Official FIH website (Qualifier 1)
Official FIH website (Qualifier 2)
Official FIH website (Qualifier 3)

Men's Hockey World Cup qualifiers
 
International field hockey competitions hosted by New Zealand
International field hockey competitions hosted by Argentina
International field hockey competitions hosted by France
2009 in French sport
2009 in New Zealand sport
2009 in Argentine sport